The 2017–18 Greek A2 Basket League was the 32nd season of the Greek A2 Basket League, the second-tier level professional club basketball league in Greece. It was the third season with the participation of 16 teams. Playoff and play out games were also held, for a third consecutive season. Peristeri clinched the championship four games before the end of the regular season. Together with the playoffs winners Holargos, they were promoted to the 2018–19 Greek Basket League.

Teams

Regular season

Promotion playoffs
In the promotion playoffs, best-of-five playoff series were played. The higher-seeded team hosted the Game 1, Game 2 and Game 5 (if necessary) at home.

Relegation playoffs

See also
2017–18 Greek Basketball Cup
2017–18 Greek Basket League (1st tier)

References

External links
Greek A2 Basketball League
Hellenic Basketball Federation 

Greek A2 Basket League
Greek
2017–18 in Greek basketball